The Wild Iris is a 1992 poetry book by Louise Glück, for which she received the Pulitzer Prize for Poetry in 1993. The book also received the Poetry Society of America's William Carlos Williams Award.

Contents
 "The Wild Iris"
 "Matins"
 "Matins"
 "Trillium"
 "Lamium"
 "Snowdrops"
 "Clear Morning"
 "Spring Snow"
 "End of Winter"
 "Matins"
 "Matins"
 "Scilla"
 "Retreating Wind"
 "The Garden"
 "The Hawthorn Tree"
 "Love in Moonlight"
 "April"
 "Violets"
 "Witchgrass"
 "The Jacob's Ladder"
 "Matins"
 "Matins"
 "Song"
 "Field Flowers"
 "The Red Poppy"
 "Clover"
 "Matins"
 "Heaven and Earth"
 "The Doorway"
 "Midsummer"
 "Vespers"
 "Vespers"
 "Vespers"
 "Daisies"
 "End of Summer"
 "Vespers"
 "Vespers"
 "Vespers"
 "Early Darkness"
 "Harvest"
 "The White Rose"
 "Ipomoea"
 "Presque Isle"
 "Retreating Light"
 "Vespers"
 "Vespers: Parousia"
 "Vespers"
 "Vespers"
 "Sunset"
 "Lullaby"
 "The Silver Lily"
 "September Twilight"
 "The Gold Lily"
 "The White Lilies."

Reception
Publishers Weekly called it "ambitious and original" and praised its "powerful, muted strangeness."

References

1992 poetry books
American poetry collections
Pulitzer Prize for Poetry-winning works